La Esencia is the sixth studio album by the Puerto Rican reggaeton duo Alexis & Fido released on March 4, 2014 through Wild Dogz Music and Warner Music Latina. At the Latin Grammy Awards of 2014, the album received a nomination for Best Music Urban Album. La Esencia received a nomination for a Lo Nuestro Award for Urban Album of the Year.

Track listing
 Imagínate - 4:11
 Salvaje (feat. Plan B) - 4:00
 Algaretismo - 4:08
 Sudao (feat. Zion & Lennox) - 3:50
 Santa De Mi Devoción - 4:10
 Alócate - 3:40
 Juiciosa (feat. J Alvarez) - 3:51
 Todo Quedó En El Olvido - 4:54
 Malas Influencias (feat. Yomo) - 3:41
 Cazadora - 3:48
 Hazme Tuyo - 3:48
 Doble Castigo (feat. Franco El Gorila) - 3:33
 Si Te Faltara - 3:27
 Aquí Es Que Ehh (feat. Tego Calderón) - 3:41
 Rompe La Cintura - 3:58
 Soltura (digital only) - 3:14

World Edition
 A Ti Te Encanta - 3:33
 Ya Era Hora (feat. Farruko) - 3:34
 Problemático (feat. Gotay) - 3:18
 Algaretismo (Remix) (feat. Arcángel & De La Ghetto) - 4:31
 Santa De Mi Devoción - 4:10
 Imagínate (Remix) (feat. Maluma) - 3:49
 Salvaje (feat. Plan B) - 4:00
 Sudao (feat. Zion & Lennox) - 3:50
 Cazadora - 3:48
 Juiciosa (feat. J. Alvarez) - 3:51
 Hazme Tuyo - 3:48
 Aquí Es Que Ehh (feat. Tego Calderon) - 3:41
 Rompe La Cintura - 3:58
 Alócate (Tropical Version) - 3:49

References

 iTunes information album

2014 albums
Alexis & Fido albums